The Willamette River Light was a navigational lighthouse at the mouth of the Willamette River in the U.S. state of Oregon.  It existed as a lighthouse with keeper from 1895 to 1935, and as an unattended light from 1935 until it burned down in the 1950s.

See also
 List of lighthouses on the Oregon Coast

References

Lighthouses completed in 1895
Lighthouses in Oregon
Transportation buildings and structures in Multnomah County, Oregon
1895 establishments in Oregon